Unhinged may refer to:
 Unhinged (album), a 1993 album by Roy Harper
 Unhinged (book), a 2018 political book by Omarosa Manigault Newman
 Unhinged (1982 film), a 1982 American horror film
 Unhinged (2020 film), a 2020 American thriller film
 Unhinged (Magic: The Gathering), a 2004 expansion set for Magic: The Gathering
 Trivial Pursuit: Unhinged, a 2004 video game
 Unhinged: Exposing Liberals Gone Wild, a 2005 political book by Michelle Malkin

See also
 Hinge (disambiguation)